Corazón en Condominio (Lucky Me) is a Mexican telenovela produced by Azteca in 2013. It stars Victor García and Cynthia Rodríguez as the main protagonists. It is based on Vecinos, a Colombian telenovela by Caracol. On 2 September 2013, Azteca started broadcasting Corazón en Condominio at 7:30pm, replacing Destino. The last episode was broadcast on 29 March 2014.

Corazón en Condominio has started filming since 1 August 2013.

Cast

References

2013 telenovelas
2013 Mexican television series debuts
2013 Mexican television series endings
Mexican telenovelas
TV Azteca telenovelas
Mexican television series based on Colombian television series
Spanish-language telenovelas